Konrad von Erlichshausen or Ellrichshausen, was born in 1390 or 1395 at Ellrichshausen, near Satteldorf in Swabia and died in 1449 in the Malbork Castle. He was the 30th Grand Master of the Teutonic Order he led from 1441 to 1449. He was succeeded by his cousin Ludwig von Erlichshausen.

References
 
 
 Friedrich Borchert, Die Hochmeister des Deutschen Ordens in Preußen appeared in Preußischen Allgemeinen Zeitung on 16 November 2002

Grand Masters of the Teutonic Order
1449 deaths
German nobility